Paramiagrammopes is an extinct genus of spiders in the family Uloboridae.

Species 
 Paramiagrammopes appendix Wunderlich, 2021
 Paramiagrammopes cretaceus Wunderlich, 2008
 Paramiagrammopes curvatus Wunderlich, 2021
 Paramiagrammopes furca Wunderlich, 2021
 Paramiagrammopes granulatus Wunderlich, 2021
 Paramiagrammopes inaequalis Wunderlich, 2021
 Paramiagrammopes inclinatus Wunderlich, 2021
 Paramiagrammopes longiclypeus Wunderlich, 2015
 Paramiagrammopes multifemurspinae Wunderlich, 2021
 Paramiagrammopes paracurvatus Wunderlich, 2021
 Paramiagrammopes patellaris (Wunderlich, 2017)
 Paramiagrammopes patellidens Wunderlich, 2015
 Paramiagrammopes pilosus Wunderlich, 2021
 Paramiagrammopes pollux Wunderlich, 2021
 Paramiagrammopes pusillus Wunderlich, 2018
 Paramiagrammopes semiapertus Wunderlich, 2021
 Paramiagrammopes simplex Wunderlich, 2021
 Paramiagrammopes sulcus Wunderlich, 2021
 Paramiagrammopes texter Wunderlich, 2021
 Paramiagrammopes unibrevispina Wunderlich, 2021
 Paramiagrammopes vesica (Wunderlich, 2008)

References 

Uloboridae
Prehistoric spider genera